The 2003 NAIA Division I women's basketball tournament was the tournament held by the NAIA to determine the national champion of women's college basketball among its Division I members in the United States and Canada for the 2002–03 basketball season.

Southern Nazarene upset four-time defending champions Oklahoma City in the championship game, 71–70, to claim the Crimson Storm's sixth NAIA national title and first since abandoning its prior Redskins nickname.

The tournament was played at the Oman Arena in Jackson, Tennessee.

Qualification

The tournament field remained fixed at thirty-two teams, although a modification was made to the seeding system utilized for the past twelve tournaments. Instead of seeding just the top sixteen teams, all teams were sorted into one of four quadrants and seeded from 1st to 8th within that quadrant. 

The tournament otherwise continued to utilize a simple single-elimination format.

Bracket

See also
2003 NAIA Division I men's basketball tournament
2003 NCAA Division I women's basketball tournament
2003 NCAA Division II women's basketball tournament
2003 NCAA Division III women's basketball tournament
2003 NAIA Division II women's basketball tournament

References

NAIA
NAIA Women's Basketball Championships
2003 in sports in Tennessee